Rise Up! is the second studio album by American musician Bobby Conn, released on Truckstop Records. It is a concept album.

Track listing

 "Twilight Of The Empire" – 1:41
 "Rise Up!" – 4:36
 "Axis '67 (part 2)" – 6:14
 "United Nations" – 2:47
 "California" – 3:30
 "Passover" – 6:24
 "A Conversation" – 1:22
 "Baby Man" – 3:56
 "Baby Man (Refrain)" – 3:04
 "White Bread" – 4:49
 "Lullaby" – 3:56
 "Ominous Drone" – 1:34
 "Rise Up, Now!" – 3:47

Personnel

 Bobby Conn – vocals, guitar
 Jim O'Rourke – bass synthesizer, guitar, piano
 Monica Bou Bou – piano, violin, vocals, melodica, strings
 Thymme Jones – trumpet
 Dylan Posa – bass on tracks 2,3,4,5,6,10,13
 Sarah Allen – drums on tracks 2,3,5,6,11,13; djembe
 Paul Mertens – flute, clarinet, tenor saxophone, piccolo flute, alto flute

References

External links
 Rise Up! Lyrics

1998 albums
Concept albums
Bobby Conn albums